Barbora Krejčíková and Kateřina Siniaková were the defending champions, however were no longer eligible to compete in junior tennis.

Tami Grende and Ye Qiuyu defeated Marie Bouzková and Dalma Gálfi in the final, 6–2, 7–6(7–5) to win the girls' doubles tennis title at the 2014 Wimbledon Championships.

Seeds

  Anhelina Kalinina /  Iryna Shymanovich (quarterfinals)
  Priscilla Hon /  Jil Teichmann (semifinals)
  Naiktha Bains /  Tornado Alicia Black (quarterfinals)
  Katie Boulter /  Ivana Jorović (quarterfinals)
  Paula Badosa Gibert /  Aliona Bolsova Zadoinov (first round)
  Jana Fett /  Ioana Loredana Roșca (first round)
  Simona Heinová /  Markéta Vondroušová (withdrew)
  Viktória Kužmová /  Kristína Schmiedlová (second round)

Draw

Finals

Top half

Bottom half

References

External links

Girls' Doubles
Wimbledon Championship by year – Girls' doubles